Kailashey Kelenkari   (also spelled Koilashe Kelenkaari) is an Indian Bengali thriller film directed by Sandip Ray based on the novel of the same name by Satyajit Ray. The film was released on 21 December 2007. Satyajit Ray visited the famous Ellora Caves near Aurangabad around 1940−41. Ray was so fascinated with the beauty of the Kailash Temple and the caves that he was inspired by it when he penned his crime thriller Kailashe Kelenkari. It is the second film of the New Feluda franchise as well as the sequel of Bombaiyer Bombete.

Synopsis
The story revolves around the blatant smuggling and illegal trading in ancient sculptures across the country. Detective Feluda steps in to solve the crime and nab the culprits. His cousin Topshe, and Lalmohanbabu, the writer of detective novels who goes by the name of Jatayu, assist him in his work. The story revolves around the theft of the head of Yakshi from the Bhuvaneshwar temple. The novel depicts how Feluda uses Topshe and Jatayu as baits in the fifteenth cave and manages to catch the main villain of the piece − Mr Rakshit, alias Chattaraj in a series of scenes filled with action and high dramatics.

Cast
 Sabyasachi Chakrabarty as Feluda
 Parambrata Chatterjee as Topshe
 Bibhu Bhattacharya as Jatayu
 Deepankar De as Mr. Chattoraj alias Rakshit
 Biplab Chatterjee as Jayanta Mullick
 Haradhan Bandopadhyay as Sidhu Jyatha
 Tom Alter as Sol Silverstein
 Ardhendu Banerjee as Professor Subhankar Bose
 J. Brandon Hill as Sam Lewson
 Pradip Bhattacharya
 Sudip Mukhopadhyay in a cameo role
 Tota Roychowdhury in a cameo role
 Achintya Dutta as village elder
 Nitya Ganguly as teashop owner
 Joydip Mukherjee as ironic fight director Apparao

References

External links

www.screenindia.com preview

2007 films
2000s Bengali-language films
Bengali-language Indian films
Indian children's films
Indian detective films
Films based on Indian novels
Films directed by Sandip Ray
Films with screenplays by Satyajit Ray
Indian crime thriller films
2007 crime thriller films 
Films set in Maharashtra